The 2019 Japan Women's Sevens was the fourth tournament within the 2018–19 World Rugby Women's Sevens Series and the third edition of the Japan Women's Sevens. It was held over the weekend of 20–21 April 2019 at Mikuni World Stadium Kitakyushu.

Format
The teams are drawn into three pools of four teams each. Each team plays every other team in their pool once. The top two teams from each pool advance to the Cup brackets while the top 2 third place teams also compete in the Cup/Plate. The other teams from each group play-off for the Challenge Trophy.

Teams
Eleven core teams played in the tournament along with one invitational team, 2018 Asia Rugby Women's Sevens Series winner Japan:

Pool stage
All times in Japan Standard Time (UTC+09:00)

Pool A

Pool B

Pool C

Knockout stage

Challenge Trophy

5th place

Cup

Tournament placings

Source: World Rugby

Players

Scoring leaders

Source: World Rugby

See also
 World Rugby Women's Sevens Series
 2018–19 World Rugby Women's Sevens Series

References

External links
 World Rugby info

2019
2018–19 World Rugby Women's Sevens Series
2019 in Japanese women's sport
2019 in women's rugby union
April 2019 sports events in Japan